Ancylosis oblitella is a species of snout moth in the genus Ancylosis. It was described by Philipp Christoph Zeller in 1848. It is found in most of Europe.

The wingspan is 18–22 mm. Adults are on wing in May and again from July to August in two generations per year.

The larvae feed on Chenopodium species.

References

External links
lepiforum.de

Moths described in 1848
oblitella
Moths of Europe